Mirus Academy is a private school junior high school and high school located in Katy, Texas in the United States of America. The school serves the City of Katy, Texas and Greater Houston area.

Academics 
Mirus Academy provides a college-preparatory academic program within the framework of small classes and flexible scheduling. High school graduation requires completion of a 26-credit curriculum that includes 4 credits of English, 4 credits of mathematics, 4 credits of science, 3 credits of social studies, 2 credits of foreign language, 1 credit of fine arts, and 8 credits of elective courses.  Honors-level and Advanced Placement courses are available.  Following graduation, 70% of Mirus Academy graduates enroll in a four-year university, 20% enroll in a two-year community college, and 10% pursue non-college options.

Class sizes are limited by design, with a 7:1 student-to-teacher ratio. Grade levels are determined by age as of September 1; however, students are placed in classes by ability rather than age, so classrooms are mixed-age and able to accommodate students with intellectual giftedness. Admission to the school is selective, and applicants with disciplinary or academic problems are excluded.

Student life 
Mirus Academy students participate in enrichment programs outside the standard course of instruction, including student council, theater productions, local field trips, international tours, yearbook, and volunteering.

School Schedule 
Mirus Academy's school hours are 8:30 am to 3:00 pm, Monday through Thursday, and 8:30 am to 1:30 pm on Fridays. An optional 3:00 pm – 4:30 pm class period is also available.  While most Mirus students follow a traditional five-day school schedule, a flexible short-week schedule is available, allowing students to pursue activities that overlap with traditional school hours, such as high-level athletic or artistic competitions.

School History 
Mirus Academy began when the leadership of The Curious Mind, a homeschooling center in the Greater Katy, Texas Area, found that families would benefit from an individualized approach to education within a traditional classroom atmosphere.  In 2010, the homeschooling center closed, and the program transitioned into a private school called Mirus Academy, adding to the many private school opportunities in the Katy area. The school was accredited in 2017 by the National Association of Private Schools.

See also 
List of private schools in Texas
Katy, Texas

References

External links 
 Mirus Academy official website

Katy, Texas
2010 establishments in Texas
Educational institutions established in 2010
Private K-12 schools in Harris County, Texas